San Miguel Tilquiapam is a town and municipality in Oaxaca in south-western Mexico. The municipality covers an area of 39.55 km². 
It is part of the Ocotlán District in the south of the Valles Centrales Region

As of 2005, the municipality had a total population of 3442.

References

Municipalities of Oaxaca